Zeno is an extinct town in Meigs Township, Muskingum County, Ohio.

History
A post office called Zeno was established in 1862, and remained in operation until 1902. The town also had a country store and a high school.

Notable residents 
 J. R. Clifford, who became West Virginia's first African-American attorney

References

Unincorporated communities in Muskingum County, Ohio
1862 establishments in Ohio
Unincorporated communities in Ohio